W. T. J. Hayes, sometimes documented as H. T. J. Hayes, was a public official and state legislator in North Carolina. He served in the North Carolina House of Representatives in 1868 for Halifax County, North Carolina. He was a signatory of North Carolina's 1868 Constitution. He was a Republican.

He also served as a justice of the peace and coroner in Halifax County.

He served at the 1868 North Carolina Constitutional Convention with fellow African American delegates. He served in the North Carolina House of Representatives with fellow representatives John H. Renfrow and Ivey Hutchings from Halifax County.

He was one of the first African Americans to serve in North Carolina's legislature (along with Henry C. Cherry, Parker D. Robbins, Wilson Cary, B. W. Morris, A. W. Stevens, John S. Leary, Isham Sweat, John H. Williamson, A. A. Crawford, Cuffie Mayo, Ivey Hutchings, John S. W. Eagles, George W. Price, Thomas A. Sykes, James H. Harris, William Cawthorn, Richard Falkner and three state senators).

See also
African-American officeholders during and following the Reconstruction era
North Carolina General Assembly of 1868–1869

References

Year of birth missing
Year of death missing
19th-century American politicians
African-American state legislators in North Carolina
Republican Party members of the North Carolina House of Representatives
African-American politicians during the Reconstruction Era
People from Halifax County, North Carolina
American justices of the peace
American coroners